The Guerreran leaf-toed gecko (Phyllodactylus bordai), also known commonly as the desert leaf-toed gecko and the salamanquesa de Guerrero in Spanish, is a species of lizard in the family Phyllodactylidae. The species is endemic to Mexico.

Etymology
The specific name, bordai, is in honor of Spaniard José de la Borda, who discovered silver in Taxco in 1716, became extremely wealthy, and built the Church of Santa Prisca de Taxco.

Geographic range
P. bordai is native to southern central Mexico, where it is found in the Mexican states of Guerrero, Morelos, Oaxaca, and Puebla.

Habitat
The preferred natural habitat of P. bordai is forest.

Reproduction
P. bordai is oviparous.

References

Further reading
Rösler H (2000). "Kommentierte Liste der rezent, subrezent und fossil bekannten Geckotaxa (Reptilia: Gekkonomorpha)". Gekkota 2: 28–153. (Phyllodactylus bordai, p. 103). (in German).
Smith HM, Taylor EH (1950). "An Annotated Checklist and Key to the Reptiles of Mexico Exclusive of the Snakes". Bulletin of the United States National Museum (199): 1–253. (Phyllodactylus bordai, p. 47).
Taylor EH (1942). "Some Geckoes of the Genus Phyllodactylus ". University of Kansas Science Bulletin 28 (1): 91–112. (Phyllodactylus bordai, new species, pp. 93–96, Figures 1A & 1B). 

Phyllodactylus
Endemic reptiles of Mexico
Reptiles described in 1942
Taxa named by Edward Harrison Taylor
Balsas dry forests
Tehuacán Valley matorral